Ophryoterpnomyia zikani is a species of ulidiid or picture-winged fly in the genus Ophryoterpnomyia of the family Ulidiidae.

References

Ulidiidae